The Maglia is a  river that flows through the Alpes-Maritimes department of southeastern France. It flows into the Roya near Breil-sur-Roya.
Its canyon is known to be one of the most beautiful in France, and it is a popular place for canyoning.

References

External links
http://www.descente-canyon.com/canyoning/canyon/2235/Maglia.html

Rivers of France
Rivers of Alpes-Maritimes
Rivers of Provence-Alpes-Côte d'Azur